The current Potosi Mining District in Humboldt County, Nevada is a major world-class producer of gold and includes the Pinson, Twin Creeks, Turquoise Creek and Getchell mines. There was a Potosi mine in Lincoln County, Nevada.

The Potosi mining district, or Potosi, was an area in Clark County of southern Nevada, U.S.  It is listed on the National Register of Historic Places and includes three structures.   The town was named after the famous silver-mining city of Potosi, Bolivia.

History
The mines in the area produced gold, silver, zinc, platinum, copper, palladium, cobalt, nickel, and antimony.  A small amount of carnotite (a vanadium-uranium mineral) was also discovered, but not mined.

Geography

Included mines
Potosi mining district was a part of the Goodsprings Mining District and included the following mines:

Christmas Mine
Dawn Mine
Green Monster Mine
Kirby Mine
New Year Mine
Shenandoah Mine
Ninetynine Mine

See also 
Potosi Mountain

References 

National Register of Historic Places in Clark County, Nevada
Spring Mountains
Gold mining in Nevada
Silver mining in Nevada
Industrial buildings and structures on the National Register of Historic Places in Nevada
Historic districts on the National Register of Historic Places in Nevada